Derelie (Dee) Mangin is a New Zealand primary care academic. As of 2018, she is a full professor at the University of Otago and holds the David Braley Nancy Gordon Chair in Family Medicine at McMaster University.

She earned her MB, BCh and DPH at the University of Otago. She is a Fellow of the Royal New Zealand College of General Practitioners.

Mangin was a member of New Zealand Pharmaceutical and Therapeutic Products Advisory Committee (known as PHARMAC).

Selected works 
 Garfinkel, Doron, and Derelie Mangin. "Feasibility study of a systematic approach for discontinuation of multiple medications in older adults: addressing polypharmacy." Archives of Internal Medicine 170, no. 18 (2010): 1648–1654.
 Corwin, Paul, Les Toop, Graham McGeoch, Martin Than, Simon Wynn-Thomas, J. Elisabeth Wells, Robin Dawson et al. "Randomised controlled trial of intravenous antibiotic treatment for cellulitis at home compared with hospital." Bmj 330, no. 7483 (2005): 129.
 Mangin, Dee, Kieran Sweeney, and Iona Heath. "Preventive health care in elderly people needs rethinking." Bmj 335, no. 7614 (2007): 285–287.
 Mangin, Dee, Iona Heath, and Marc Jamoulle. "Beyond diagnosis: rising to the multimorbidity challenge." (2012): e3526.
 Mangin, Dee, and Les Toop. "The Quality and Outcomes Framework: what have you done to yourselves?." (2007): 435–437.

References

External links
 
 

Living people
New Zealand women academics
Year of birth missing (living people)
Academic staff of McMaster University
Academic staff of the University of Otago
University of Otago alumni
New Zealand medical researchers
Canadian medical researchers
21st-century New Zealand medical doctors
New Zealand women writers